Pont-de-Loup is a village of Wallonia and a district of the municipality of Aiseau-Presles, located in the province of Hainaut, Belgium. 

The residents of  Pont-de-Loup are referred to as "Lupipontain(e)." The village is officially a "lieu dit" ("named place") in the commune of Tourrettes-sur-Loup.. The village is best known for an annual religious festival in honor of Our Lady Del Manock. Our Lady of Manock is the subject of veneration for pilgrims hoping to invoke the saint's miraculous healing of deafness. Every year in August, a procession is held along with the feast day for the patron church of Saint-Clèt.

The village is nestled in a bend of the River Sambre.

History
Pont-de-Loup was once part of a huge estate ceded to Eckhard in 840 A.D. by Louis the Pious . He was a lord at the time in Wallonia, in the province of Hainaut.
Today, it is part of the municipality of Aiseau-Presles.

Etymology
Possible etymology: from 'fundus' (Latin) for estate and '-lo(o)' from wood (Germanic lauha, marisk (Frankish language)-> du marais (French) -> marsh (English)

Old forms

Also known as
Baty, Champs Saint-Clèt (French The fields around the Church of Saint-Clèt), Joncquière, Malfait, Monts, Wairchat.

The cult "Notre Dame Del Manock"
The Blessed Mary of Del Manock was mentioned for the first time in 1358. It is claimed that Mary was a local virgin, who attracted many deaf suppliants and healed them of their deafness.

Information from The Royal Society of History "Le Vieux Châtelet" website 
Every year on the last Sunday of August, the village of Pont-de-Loup holds a procession of Our Lady Del Manock at a pilgrimage founded in her honor.  It is also an important feast day for the patron church of Saint-Clèt. The procession in Pont-de-Loup is unique because of the presence of the group representing Our Lady of Manock, the local Virgin and  pilgrims gather in the hopes of invoking the healing of deafness. The procession and pilgrimage are combined together in one large procession for the Blessed Notre Dame faithful and pilgrims.

The beginning of the celebration is marked by everyone attending Mass. During the service, many people gather outside the square, as the church is too small to accommodate all.  After Mass, the procession forms at the church. It is led by a local group of around one hundred men called the "Walkers of Saint-Eloi" who march in time to pipes and drums.  The procession proceeds around the first quarter of the church, and then onward to the river Sambre, finally stopping at the entrance of a narrow path which leads to the fountain of Our Lady Del Manock. This is the most essential part of the pilgrimage.  Once arriving at the fountain, the afflicted drink the clear water which is deemed to be a miraculous cure for deafness. Since World War II, this religious procession has been the most striking attraction of this village.

Sport
Pont-de-Loup has a football club known as A.S.B.L. Sporting Pont-de-Loup; and a basketball club, known as the Royal Eclairs.

Landmark sites
The Church of Saint Clèt
Unité de Valorisation Energétique (UVE) de Pont-de-Loup

References

External links
Commune of Aiseau Presles, in French
The Royal Society of History, "Le Vieux Châtelet", in French

Former municipalities of Hainaut (province)